Cernătești is a commune in Buzău County, Muntenia, Romania, located in the Subcarpathian hills, in the valley of the river Slănic. It is composed of eight villages: Aldeni, Băești, Căldărușa, Cernătești, Fulga, Manasia, Vlădeni and Zărneștii de Slănic. The 2002 Romanian census showed a population of 4,027 inhabitants.

Natives
 Ion Băieșu

Notes 

Communes in Buzău County
Localities in Muntenia